Sampedro is a surname, and may refer to:

 José Luis Sampedro (1917-2013), Spanish economist and novelist
 Matilde Muñoz Sampedro (1900-1969), Spanish actress
 Melchor García Sampedro (1821-1858), Spanish Dominican missionary and saint
 Edelmira Sampedro y Robato (1906-1994), Countess of Covadonga
 Frank Sampedro (born 1949), American musician
 Ramón Sampedro (1943-1998), Spanish fisherman who fought for right of assisted suicide